The 1962 Hawaii Rainbows football team represented the University of Hawaiʻi at Mānoa as an independent during the 1962 NCAA College Division football season. In their first season under head coach Jim Asato, the Rainbows compiled a 6–2 record. This marked the return of varsity football at the university after a team was not fielded for the 1961 season.

Schedule

References

Hawaii
Hawaii Rainbow Warriors football seasons
Hawaii Rainbows football